The 2007 Gold Coast Titans season was the first in the club's history. They competed in the NRL's 2007 Telstra Premiership, finishing the regular season 12th (out of 16).

At the end of the  season Luke Bailey and Anthony Laffranchi were named co-winners of the club's inaugural Paul Broughton Medal for best and fairest player of 2007.

Season summary
The Gold Coast Titans' first ever trial match resulted in a 32-6 loss to the previous season's grand finalists Melbourne Storm, however wins over the Parramatta Eels and Penrith Panthers later on led to predictions for a bright start to the Titans' premiership campaign.

Their first premiership match was played against the St. George Illawarra Dragons at Suncorp Stadium on 18 March. After at one stage leading, the Titans lost a cliffhanger, 20-18. But this disappointment was soon erased with the club registering its first ever win against Ricky Stuart's Cronulla-Sutherland Sharks at Carrara Stadium the following round.

There were mixed results in the first half of the season; highlights included wins over Preston Campbell's old club the Penrith Panthers at Penrith in round four, the Brisbane Broncos at Suncorp Stadium (a Titans home game) in round five in a match which was marred by a horrible leg injury to Michael Henderson and the virus-struck Parramatta Eels by 38-12 in round seven. The Parramatta side had blamed its loss to the Titans on its preparation of its squad whom at least half of them had been struck with illness in the week leading up to the match.

By round fifteen, everything seemed to be coming together. However, injuries to many players, none more so than captain Scott Prince, struck the Titans at the wrong end of the season and lost eight of its last ten matches (including a 56-10 loss to Canberra in round 18 and a final round 50-6 loss to the Melbourne Storm in Melbourne) to fall to 12th at the end of its inaugural season. Despite this, their first season was deemed not a failure but not a success either. Only wins over the Wests Tigers and Sydney Roosters, both at home, saved the Titans from a lower finish.

Results

References

Gold Coast Titans seasons
Gold Coast Titans season